Nelson Piquet is a former Formula One driver and triple World Champion.

Nelson Piquet may also refer to:

Nelson Piquet Jr., son of the above, also a former Formula One driver
Autódromo Internacional Nelson Piquet, race track in Rio de Janeiro, former host of the Brazilian Grand Prix
Autódromo Internacional Nelson Piquet (Brasília), race track in Brasília, Brazil

Nelson Piquet (disambiguation)